John Apharry was an English priest in the 16th century.

Apharry  was educated at the University of Oxford.  He held livings at Fen Ditton, Stretham and Bluntisham. He was Archdeacon of Ely from 1568 until his death in 1549.

References

1549 deaths
Alumni of the University of Oxford
Archdeacons of Northampton
Archdeacons of Ely
16th-century English Anglican priests